Mažeikiai Power Plant is a natural gas-fired power plant in Mažeikiai, Lithuania. Its primary use is to serve oil refinery ORLEN Lietuva.

References

Energy infrastructure completed in 1979
Natural gas-fired power stations in Lithuania
Buildings and structures in Mažeikiai